Arita Dam is a gravity dam located in Saga Prefecture in Japan. The dam is used for flood control and water supply. The catchment area of the dam is 2.2 km2. The dam impounds about 18  ha of land when full and can store 1880 thousand cubic meters of water. The construction of the dam was started on 1958 and completed in 1961.

References

Dams in Saga Prefecture
1961 establishments in Japan